The following is the list of hosts and members of the Philippine noontime variety show It's Showtime.

Hosts and other cast members

Hosts
Current hosts 
 Vhong Navarro  
 Anne Curtis 
 Vice Ganda 
 Teddy Corpuz 
 Jugs Jugueta 
 Karylle 
 Jhong Hilario 
 Ryan Bang 
 Amy Perez 
 Jackie Gonzaga 
 Ion Perez 
 Kim Chiu 
 Ogie Alcasid 
MC Calaquian 
Lassy Marquez 
Cianne Dominguez 

Former hosts
 Kim Atienza 
 Billy Crawford 
 Coleen Garcia 
 Eric Tai 
 Mariel Rodriguez 
 Joey Marquez 
 James Reid 
 Nadine Lustre

Guest co-hosts
 Bianca Manalo 
 Iya Villania 
 Nikki Gil  
 KC Concepcion  
 Ina Feleo 
 Denise Laurel   
 Maja Salvador  
 Georgina Wilson  
 Angelica Panganiban  
 Carmina Villaroel  
 Angel Locsin  
 Enchong Dee  
 Cristine Reyes 
 Erich Gonzales  
 Iza Calzado  
 Jericho Rosales  
 Jessy Mendiola  
 Alex Gonzaga  
 Sarah Geronimo   
 K Brosas   
 Robi Domingo  
 Luis Manzano 
 Bela Padilla   
 Pia Wurtzbach  
 Ethel Booba 
 JinHo Bae (Songyupsal) 
 Yassi Pressman 
 Arci Muñoz 
 Catriona Gray 
 Maymay Entrata

Other cast members
Current cast members
 DJ MOD  
 DJ Nick  
 DJ Alvin  
 Ervin Plaza   
 Showtime Dancers  
 Six Part Invention 
 Tawag ng Tanghalan hurados    
 TNT Alumni  
 Ana Ramsey  
 Nerijay Lopera 
 Sam Coloso 
 Batang Cute-Pos 
Former cast members  
 May Francisco 
 Mel Feliciano 
 Jhonas Yuzon † 
 XB Gensan 
 Bida Kapamilya Rounds 1 and 2 celebrity mentors 
 Joy Rendon  
 Rhed Bustamante  
 Rodrigo Manansala  
 Alex Calleja  
 Angelica Jane Yap  
 Xia Vigor 
 Miho Nishida 
 Tommy Esguerra  
 Enzo Pelojero 
 Hashtags  
 Ryan Rems Sarita 
 Elly Rose Boñales 
 Bayani Agbayani 
 Junior Hashtags 
 GirlTrends/GT 
 TNT Band 
 JJ "Tristan" Quilantang 
 Nicole Cordoves 
 Miss Q and A Escorts 
 Donna Cariaga 
 Andrew E. 
 Stephanie "Stephen" Robles 
 Miss Q and A Queens  
 BidaMan 
 Issa Meaker  
 Christine Samson  
 Donald Neri 
 Aron Sunga 
 Mini Ms. U Escorts 
 Versus judges 
 Ruffa Gutierrez 
 Janice de Belen 
 DGrind dancers 
 Zeinab Harake 
 Girl On Fire Hataw royalties

Dance performers

Hashtags / HT
The Hashtags is an all-male dance group that was introduced in November 2015. Former Pinoy Big Brother housemate Zeus Collins has served as the choreographer and de facto leader of the group since its inception. The following were the pioneering members of the Hashtags along with Collins: Pinoy Big Brother: 737 winner Jimboy Martin; former Pinoy Big Brother housemates Tom Doromal and Jameson Blake; Star Magic artists McCoy de Leon, Paulo Angeles, Jon Lucas, Ryle Santiago and Ronnie Alonte; and finalists of the show's Gandang Lalake segment Nikko Natividad and Luke Conde. It's Showtime opened an application process in November 2016 for new members of the Hashtags with males from 16 to 22 years old eligible to apply. Eight new members were introduced on Valentine's Day of 2017.

Former members
 Ronnie Alonte  
 Paulo Angeles 
 Jameson Blake   
 Zeus Collins 
 Luke Conde 
 McCoy de Leon  
 Tom Doromal  
 Jon Lucas  
 Jimboy Martin   
 Nikko Natividad  
 Ryle Paolo Santiago   
 Bugoy Cariño  
 Rayt Carreon  
 Maru Delgado 
 Franco Hernandez †  
 Charles "CK" Kieron  
 Vitto Marquez  
 Wilbert Ross 
 Kid Yambao

GirlTrends / GT
The GirlTrends was introduced on February 13, 2016, as the distaff counterpart of the Hashtags. Former Pinoy Big Brother housemates and young actresses comprise the group. On May 9, 2019, the girl group was renamed into GT.

Former members
 Mikee Agustin  
 Loisa Andalio 
 Dawn Chang   
 Kelley Day  
 Jane de Leon 
 Chienna Filomeno 
 Kamille Filoteo  
 Nikki Gonzales 
 Joana Hipolito 
 Barbie Imperial 
 Mica Javier  
 Leyana Magat  
 Jessica Marasigan  
 Miho Nishida 
 Erin Ocampo   
 Riva Quenery 
 Maris Racal 
 Karen Reyes  
 Sammie Rimando  
 Maika Rivera 
 Devon Seron   
 Krissha Viaje

Junior Hashtags
Former members
 Orange Bilgera  
 Aaron Paul Creus  
 Gab dela Cruz  
 JC Gumacal  
 Aevan Laguilles  
 Kiel Ligon  
 Nicoli Lista  
 Nhel Symone Dayrit

BidaMan
Former members
 Eris Aragoza 
 JR Baring 
 Jiro Custodio  
 Dan Delgado  
 Jervy delos Reyes 
 Jay Dizon   
 Wize Estabillo  
 MJ Evangelista 
 Miko Gallardo  
 Kristof Garcia 
 Nathan Garcia  
 Thor Gomez  
 Vien King  
 Polo Laurel  
 Jin Macapagal 
 Ron Macapagal	 
 John Padilla  
 Johannes Rissler    
 Yuki Sakamoto

References

It's Showtime